Hawken School is an independent, coeducational, college preparatory day school in Northeast Ohio.

Hawken currently has two main campuses, the Lower and Middle Schools in Lyndhurst and the Upper School in Chester Township, plus a third, an urban campus in University Circle, The Sally & Bob Gries Center for Experiential and Service Learning, which is utilized by all grade levels. Hawken's motto is quoted from John Lancaster Spalding's Education and the Higher Life: "That the better self shall prevail, and each generation introduce its successor to a higher plane of life"; although a sign with the secondary motto, "Fair Play," hangs in every classroom on either campus. A new middle school complex at the Lyndhurst campus was built for the 2006–07 school year.  Construction on the Gates Mills campus finished in 2016, marking the opening of Stirn Hall.  D. Scott Looney is the current Head of School, having assumed the position on July 1, 2006.

History
The school's founder and namesake, James A. Hawken, opened his school for boys in Cleveland's Hough neighborhood in 1915.  First housed at 1572 Ansel Road, the school later moved to 1588 Ansel Road, shortly before relocating to its current Lyndhurst campus in 1922. Because James Hawken believed in one-on-one education for the boys at his school, the original building on the Lyndhurst campus, now containing part of the middle school, has many rooms designed to seat between eight and ten boys.  Later, in 1961, the school added a 325-acre high school campus in Chester Township, housing formerly grades 10 through 12, and now also grade 9.  The school became coed in 1975.  In the fall of 2006, Lincoln Hall was added on to the Middle School, adding much-needed classroom space.  In the fall of 2009, Hawken commenced a tablet computer program for grade 6 which later spread throughout the middle and high schools.  The Sally & Bob Gries Center for Experiential and Service Learning (also called The Gries Center), located in University Circle, opened on August 29, 2010.  In the summer of 2011, the preschool underwent a renovation.  Additionally, due to increased enrollment, the school has renovated the lower school building, adding 5,540 square feet of space into the 2nd and 3rd grade area, as well renovating 8,125 square feet of space.  Changes included the addition of a new classroom to the Kindergarten and 1st grades; renovations to the performing arts classrooms as well as the addition of a fourth classroom; relocation and remodeling of a science classroom; restoration of the main lobby and exterior remodeling.  The new Hurwitz Hall's construction finished in August 2013.
In late 2013, Hawken announced plans for a $24.5m renovation of the Gates Mills campus, Stirn Hall. Designed by architectural firm Westlake, Reed, Leskosky, the project would bring the academic complex to 106,000 square feet. This project finished in the fall of 2016, with the grand opening on August 20–21.

Hawken has long-standing rivalries with the three other founding members of the Cleveland Council of Independent Schools: Laurel School, Hathaway Brown School, and University School.

Athletics

Ohio High School Athletic Association State Championships

 Girls Golf - 2013
 Girls Track - 1999, 2000
 Girls Swimming - 1984, 1985, 1986, 1987, 1988, 1990, 1996, 1997, 1999, 2000, 2001, 2002, 2003, 2004, 2005, 2006, 2007, 2008, 2009, 2010, 2011, 2012, 2013, 2014, 2015, 2016, 2017, 2018, 2019, 2020, 2021, 2022
 Boys Swimming - 1988, 1989, 2017, 2021
 Boys Golf - 1977, 1978
 Boys Soccer – 2000

Accreditation and membership
Accredited, Independent Schools Association of the Central States
Accredited, Ohio State Board of Education
Member, National Association for College Admission Counseling
Member, National Association of Independent Schools
Member, Ohio Association for College Admission Counseling
Member, College Board

Notable alumni

William Bayer, 1953, Edgar Award-winning crime fiction writer
Charles B. Bolton, 1927, dentist
G. Armour Craig, American academic and president of Amherst College
William Daroff, 1986, Jewish community leader
Steven M. Dettelbach, 1984, United States Attorney for the Northern District of Ohio
Kenyon Farrow, 1993, award-winning writer, journalist, and social justice activist
Alexis Floyd, actress, best known for role of Neff in Inventing Anna, Netflix series
A. Marc Gillinov, 1980, heart surgeon at Cleveland Clinic, Judith Dion Pyle Chair in Heart Valve Research at Cleveland Clinic
Richard J. Green, 1983, American chemist known for his work against Holocaust denial
Peter Harrold, 2002, professional ice hockey player in the National Hockey League
Scott Healy, 1978, keyboardist for The Max Weinberg 7
Roberta A. Kaplan, 1984, lawyer
Arthur Laffer, 1955, economist
Jim Margolis, 1989, Emmy Award-winning producer
O.J. McDuffie, 1988, professional football player in the National Football League
Mark Moyar, 1989, military historian, professor, former USAID official, author of (inter alia) Triumph Forsaken: The Vietnam War, 1954–1965 (2006)
Alan B. McElroy, 1978, screenwriter
Nick Minchin, 1971, Australian Senator and Minister for Finance and Administration
Molly Shannon, 1983, actress
Justine Siegal, baseball coach.
Melanie Valerio, 1987, 1996 Olympic gold medalist in swimming
Nico Walker, 2003, best-selling author and bank robber
Evan Wright, 1983, writer for Rolling Stone and Vanity Fair

References

External links
Official site

Educational institutions established in 1915
Independent School Association of the Central States
Preparatory schools in Ohio
High schools in Cuyahoga County, Ohio
High schools in Geauga County, Ohio
Private K-12 schools in Ohio
Private high schools in Ohio
Private middle schools in Ohio
Private elementary schools in Ohio
1915 establishments in Ohio